The 1951 Tennessee A&I Tigers football team represented Tennessee Agricultural & Industrial State College as a member of the Midwest Athletic Association (MAA) during the 1951 college football season. In their eighth season under head coach Henry Kean, the Tigers compiled an 8–2 record and outscored opponents by a total of 203 to 93. The Dickinson System rated Tennessee A&I as the No. 3 black college football team for 1951 with a score of 23.71, behind only Florida A&M (24.71) and Morris Brown (24.43). The team played its home games in Nashville, Tennessee.

Schedule

References

Tennessee A&I
Tennessee State Tigers football seasons
Tennessee A&I Tigers